Henry Hanford (1784–1866) was a farmer and the first Euro-American settler of Lewistown, Ohio, United States.

Hanford was born in Norwalk, Connecticut. He emigrated with his brother Thaddeus, who had preceded him to the then new country, to Hamilton County, Ohio in 1806. He settled at Columbia Township, on the Ohio river and was engaged in running a provision boat from Columbia to Natchez. In 1810 Henry Hanford married Harriet Chamberlin, a native of New York. Two years later the young family moved to Champaign County, now Clark County.

In January 1834 Henry Hanford purchased  of public land (according to the provisions of the Land Act of 1820) in Logan County, Ohio, utilizing the land office at Piqua. Later he acquired more land, using the Wapakoneta land office, until he owned  in Logan County. He opened a general store and became the first postmaster of Lewistown.

Henry and Harriet Hanford had "seven children, all of whom grew to years of maturity". Henry Hanford died on December 31, 1866, and was buried at Lewistown Cemetery, Ohio.

Further reading
 "Henry Hanford", History of Logan County and Ohio. Chicago: O.L. Baskin & Co., 1880. (p. 735)

References

External links

American pioneers
Founding settlers of Norwalk, Connecticut
People from Logan County, Ohio
1784 births
1866 deaths